Enrico Richino Castiglioni (1914-2000) was an Italian writer, engineer, and architect best known for his unbuilt and frequently unbuildable concepts for buildings.

Castiglioni attended the Polytechnic University of Milan, graduating with a degree in civil engineering in 1934.

Gallery

References 

20th-century Italian architects
Modernist architects from Italy
Architects from Lombardy
Polytechnic University of Milan alumni
1914 births
2000 deaths
People from Busto Arsizio